Events from the year 1546 in art.

Events
 The plan for the new St. Peter's Basilica dome, begun by Bramante, is continued by the new chief architect, Michelangelo.
 The Farnese Hercules is removed from the Baths of Caracalla by Cardinal Cardinal Alessandro Farnese to the Palazzo Farnese in Rome.

Works

Paintings
 Domenico Beccafumi – Pagan Child Couple
 Jacopo Bassano – The Adoration of the Shepherds
 Girolamo Siciolante da Sermoneta – Holy Family with Saint Michael
 Lorenzo Lotto – San Giacomo dell'Orio Altarpiece
 William Scrots
 Anamorphic portrait of Edward, Prince of Wales
 Henry Howard Earl of Surrey (attributed)
 Titian – Pope Paul III and his Grandsons

Births
March 21 - Bartholomeus Spranger, Flemish Northern Mannerist painter, draughtsman, and etcher (died 1611)

Deaths
January 4 - Camillo Boccaccino, Italian painter active mainly in Cremona and regions of Lombardy (born 1504)
January 11 - Gaudenzio Ferrari, Italian painter and sculptor of the Renaissance (born 1471)
August 1 - Peter Faber (or Pierre Favre), French Jesuit painter and sculptor (born 1506)
October 23 - Peter Flötner, German designer, sculptor, and printmaker (born 1490)
November 1 - Giulio Romano, Italian painter and architect (born 1499)
date unknown
Valerio Belli, Italian engraver and medallion maker (born 1470)
Jan van Calcar, Netherlands-born Italian painter, pupil of Titian (born 1499)
Bartolomeo Veneto - Italian portrait painter (born 1502)
probable - Marinus van Reymerswaele, Dutch Renaissance painter (born 1490

References

 
Years of the 16th century in art